Nikolaos Loudovikos (born 1959) is a Greek Orthodox theologian, priest (protopresbyter), psychologist, author and professor.

Biography
Fr. Nikolaos Loudovikos was born in Volos, Greece in 1959. He studied Psychology and Education at the University of Athens, Theology at the University of Thessaloniki, Philosophy at Paris IV, Philosophy and Roman Catholic Theology at the Catholic Institute of Paris, Philosophy and Protestant Theology at the University of Cambridge. He received a Ph.D. in 1989 from the Theological Faculty of Aristotle University of Thessaloniki. The title of his dissertation was: The Eucharistic Ontology in the Theological Thought of St. Maximus the Confessor.

He has worked as a researcher at the Tyndale House (Cambridge). He has taught and lectured at the Centre for Advanced Religious and Theological Studies  (CARTS) of the Department of Theology at the University of Cambridge, at Durham University, as well as at other Universities and Research Centres. Today he is a professor of Dogmatics and Philosophy at the University Ecclesiastical Academy of Thessaloniki, visiting professor at the University Balamand (Lebanon), the Institute for Orthodox Christian Studies (Cambridge), and Research Fellow at the University of Winchester in the United Kingdom. He is Senior Editor of Analogia Journal - The Pemptousia Journal of Theological Studies, a peer-reviewed academic journal dedicated to the scholarly exposition and discussion of the theological principles of the Christian faith.

Fr. Nikolaos Loudovikos is a member of the Saint Irenaeus Joint Orthodox-Catholic Working Group, where he has served as Co-Secretary (Orthodox) between the years 2004 and 2018.

Quotes
"Fortunately, Christianity is neither Platonism nor Stoicism. Everything in our body and soul is created by God, and as such, absolutely sacred. It is up to my own freedom to get angry, fall in love, play, create, eat, rejoice, be sorrowful, in such a manner that will bring me continuously closer to the Divine Source of my being: this is the meaning of the Incarnation. God does not call me to escape from this world, but to transform it into a place of His manifestation"

"Anselm says: why did the Incarnation happen? So that the Son of God could be punished in the place of man. Gregory the Theologian says: the Incarnation happened, 'because humanity must be sanctified by the Humanity of God'. Quite the opposite, in other words. And the Theologian continues: the only thing God wants, is to stop decay. Now try and build legalism on a position such as that of the Greek Fathers! It is impossible. That's why many of my fellow students in France marvelled at us Greeks, saying: «vous êtes anarchistes» (you are anarchists)!"

Bibliography

Fr. Loudovikos has published the following books in Greek (titles translated):

 Eucharistic Ontology, Domos, Athens, 1992, 
 Closed Spirituality and the Meaning of Self, Ellinika Grammata, Athens, 1999, 
 The Apophatic Ecclesiology of Consubstantiality: The Ancient Church Today, Armos, Athens 2002,  
 Theopoiia - The Postmodern Theological Quest, Armos, Athens, 2007, 
 Psychoanalysis and Orthodox Theology - About Desire, Catholicity and Eschatology, Armos, Athens, 2006, 
 Orthodoxy and Modernization - Byzantine Individualization, State and History in the Perspective of the European Future, Armos, Athens, 2006, 960-527-337-3
 Theological History of Ancient Hellenic Philosophy - Presocratics, Socrates, Plato, Pournaras Publishing, Athens, 2003, 
 Interpretation in Psychiatry and Psychotherapy, Stanghellini Giovanni, Vasilakos Georgios, Gemenetzis Kostas, Didaskalou Thanos, Loudovikos Nikolaos, Begzos Marios P., Papageorgiou Thanos, Pentzopoulou-Valala Teresa, Chartokollis Petris, Ypsilon Publishing, 2005, 
 The Terrors of the Person and the Ordeals of Love: Critical Thoughts for a Postmodern Theological Ontology, Armos, Athens, 2009
 Striving for Participation: Being and Methexis in Gregory Palamas and Thomas Aquinas, Armos, Athens, 2010
 A History of God's Love, The Holy Monastery of Vatopedi, Holy Mountain, 2015

Fr. Loudovikos has published the following books in English:

A Eucharistic Ontology: Maximus the Confessor's Eschatological Ontology of Being as Dialogical Reciprocity, Translated by Elizabeth Theokritoff, revised and extended. Holy Cross Orthodox Press, Brookline, Mass, 2010, 
Church in the Making: An Apophatic Ecclesiology of Consubstantiality, Translated by Norman Russell, revised and extended. St. Vladimir's Seminary Press, Crestwood, NY, 2016, 
 Analogical Identities: The Creation of the Christian Self: Beyond Spirituality and Mysticism in the Patristic Era (Studia Traditionis Theologiae) (English, Ancient Greek and Latin Edition), Brepols Publishers; Multilingual Edition, Belgium, 2019,

See also
George Metallinos
Hierotheos (Vlachos)

Notes

References
 Father Nicolaos Loudovicos, Cosmos in Science and Religion, Under the Auspices of Aristotle University of Thessaloniki, A project contributing to the dialogue among Science, Philosophy and Theology, retrieved on February 22, 2009
 About Theology - Nikolaos Loudovikos, website of Pavlos Vatavalis, retrieved on February 22, 2009

External links
 True Christianity: The Soul's Journey, website of the Orthodox Outlet for Dogmatic Enqureries. 
 The problem of Evil, from Augustine to contemporary Genetics, website of the Orthodox Outlet for Dogmatic Enqureries. 
 Bishop-monism and Populism in the Orthodox Tradition, website of the Orthodox Outlet for Dogmatic Enqureries. 
 Articles from homilies of Fr. Nikolaos Loudovikos, website of St. Dionysios Monastery of Olympus. 
 Homilies of Fr. Nikolaos Loudovikos (mp3), website of the Lifegiving Spring Church of Varia, Lesbos. 
 The Problem of Evil from Augustine to the Modern Genetics, from the periodical "Synaxis", Issue 95, April - June 2005 
 The Individualization of Death and Euthanasia, Holy Synod of the Church of Greece, Committee of Bioethics 
 Episcopomonism and Laicism in Orthodox Tradition, Academy of Theological Studies, January 22, 2005 
 Let's not Lose the Passions. Let's Transform them, Interview originally published in the Periodical "Anti" on January 13, 2007. 
 We put Phantasies about Power and Dominion in the Place of God, Interview originally pubslished in Eleftherotypia (Greek National Daily Newspaper) on April 23, 2008 
 Articles and speeches by Fr. Nikolaos Loudovikos, Antibaro.gr 
 Orthodox Lectures, Website of the Holy Monastery of the Life-Giving-Spring at Vareia, Mytilene, Greece 

1959 births
Living people
Greek Eastern Orthodox priests
Greek theologians
University of Paris alumni
20th-century Eastern Orthodox priests
21st-century Eastern Orthodox priests
Eastern Orthodox theologians
Greek philosophers
Critics of atheism
People from Volos